Evenes Air Station is a military airbase of the Royal Norwegian Air Force (RNoAF) located in the town of Evenes in Evenes Municipality, Nordland county, Norway.

History
The air station was initially opened in 1979 as a hub for Bodø Main Air Station, but became an independent entity in 1988. Operations at Evenes were reduced in 1993 and the station was taken out of full operational use.

In 2012, the parliament decided to turn Evenes into a forward air base for Quick Reaction Alert. The air station will have a capacity for stationing a QRA of 15 fighter aircraft, as well as handling exercises with allied aircraft. The air station is estimated to produce 1,600 aircraft movements per year once operative.

From 1 January 2020, the new 133 Luftving was reestablished at Evenes.

The first F-35 squadron started operations from Evenes in September 2021.

Operations
The Norwegian Defence Estates Agency was commissioned to ensure that sufficient construction (EBA) and infrastructure are in place by August 2022. Test operations together with the Armed Forces and the Air Force are expected to start at the same time. By the end of the first quarter of 2023, all EBA should be ready for the Armed Forces for full operation. What will be built on Evenes will cover the national needs of maritime patrol aircraft, as well as consist of offices and administrative facilities for the 333 Squadron.

Additionally, adaptation of hangars and the construction of facilities for the F-35, new construction of office buildings, officers' quarters, crew quarters and a hospital, as well as security measures will be constructed. The largest construction assignment is the P-8 hangar with associated operational surfaces, which will be ready in 2021/22.

Runway arresting gear will be installed for the new fighter jets.

By 2025, it is planned that there will be up to 500 employees and 300 conscripts at Evenes.

References

Airports in Nordland
Royal Norwegian Air Force stations
1979 establishments in Norway
Military installations in Nordland